Asociación Deportiva Santa Bárbara is a Costa Rican football club, currently playing in the Tercera División.

They are based in Santa Bárbara de Heredia and play their home games at the Estadio Carlos Alvarado Villalobos.

History
Founded in 1943, Club Sport Barbareño represented Santa Bárbara in the first division of the national football league. Between 1962 and 1975, they played in the third division before winning the title in 1976 and subsequent promotion to the Second Division. The team changed its name to Asociación Deportiva Barbareña in 1984. In 1997 they won promotion to the Costa Rican Primera División and made their debut in the top tier against San Carlos on 17 August 1997. In summer 2000, they announced the arrival of former World Champion Mario Kempes as their new manager, only for the Argentinian to leave the club after a week due to a dispute between the club and the players representatives. In 2004, the team sold their franchise and moved to Puntarenas, becoming Puntarenas F.C.

Santa Bárbara have totalled 7 seasons in the top tier, with a 4th place being their best league result.

Honours

National
Segunda División de Costa Rica: 1
 1997

Tercera División de Costa Rica: 1
 1976

References

External links
 LINAFA

Football clubs in Costa Rica
Association football clubs established in 1943
1943 establishments in Costa Rica